Fruitdale is an unincorporated community in Jackson Township, Brown County, in the U.S. state of Indiana.

History
A post office was established at Fruitdale in 1909, and remained in operation until 1937. The community was likely named from fruit orchards nearby.

Geography

References

Unincorporated communities in Brown County, Indiana
Unincorporated communities in Indiana